Nyzhankovychi is an urban-type settlement in Sambir Raion of Lviv Oblast in Ukraine. It is located on the left bank of the Wiar, a right tributary of the San in the drainage basin of the Vistula, directly at the border with Poland. Nyzhankovychi belongs to Dobromyl urban hromada, one of the hromadas of Ukraine. Population: 

Until 18 July 2020, Nyzhankovychi belonged to Staryi Sambir Raion. The raion was abolished in July 2020 as part of the administrative reform of Ukraine, which reduced the number of raions of Lviv Oblast to seven. The area of Staryi Sambir Raion was merged into Sambir Raion.

Economy

Transportation
Nyzhankovychi railway station is on the railway connecting Khyriv and Przemyśl, this is the last station in Ukraine. There is infrequent passenger traffic in the direction of Khyriv; there is no passenger traffic to Poland. Until 1994, the stretch between Nyzhankovychi and Khtriv had a dual gauge, which, in principle, allowed the trains to cross into Poland. After the 1994 reconstruction, only the Ukrainian gauge (1520 mm) remains.

The settlement has road access to Khyriv and from there further to Sambir and Lviv. The roads do not cross to Poland around Nyzhankovychi.

References

Urban-type settlements in Sambir Raion